Vause is both a given name and surname. Notable people with the name include:

 Alex Vause, fictional character
 John Vause (born 1968), Australian journalist
 Taylor Vause (born 1991), Canadian ice hockey player
 Vause Raw (1921–2001), South African politician